Group B of the 2006 Fed Cup Europe/Africa Zone Group III was one of two pools in the Europe/Africa zone of the 2006 Fed Cup, an international women's tennis competition. Six teams competed in a round-robin competition. The top team, Bosnia and Herzegovina, thereby qualified for entry to Group II of the Europe/Africa_Zone for 2007.

Bosnia and Herzegovina vs. Liechtenstein

Bosnia and Herzegovina vs. Azerbaijan

Egypt vs. Botswana

Namibia vs. Azerbaijan

Bosnia and Herzegovina vs. Botswana

Egypt vs. Namibia

Egypt vs. Azerbaijan

Namibia vs. Liechtenstein

Bosnia and Herzegovina vs. Namibia

Egypt vs. Liechtenstein

Botswana vs. Azerbaijan

Bosnia and Herzegovina vs. Egypt

Botswana vs. Namibia

Botswana vs. Liechtenstein

Liechtenstein vs. Azerbaijan

  placed first in this group and thus advanced to Group II for 2007, where they placed fifth overall.

See also
Fed Cup structure

References

External links
 Fed Cup website

2006 Fed Cup Europe/Africa Zone